The Camden County Technical Schools is a countywide public school district headquartered in the Sicklerville section of Gloucester Township that provides vocational and technical education to high school and adult students in Camden County, New Jersey, United States.

As of the 2017-18 school year, the district, comprising two schools, had an enrollment of 2,091 students and 191.6 classroom teachers (on an FTE basis), for a student–teacher ratio of 10.9:1.

Schools
Schools in the district (with 2017-18 enrollment data from the National Center for Education Statistics) are:
Camden County Technical Schools Gloucester Township Campus in Gloucester Township (1,322 students)
Wanda Pichardo, Principal 
Camden County Technical Schools Pennsauken Campus in Pennsauken Township (771 students)
Dr. John Hourani, Interim Principal

Administration
Core members of the district's administration are:
Patricia E. Fitzgerald, Superintendent
Scott Kipers, Business Administrator / Board Secretary

The district's board of education consists of the county superintendent of schools and four public members who set policy and oversee the fiscal and educational operation of the district through its administration. As a Type I school district, the board's trustees are appointed by the Director of the Camden County board of chosen freeholders to serve four-year terms of office on a staggered basis, with one member up for reappointment each year.

References

External links
Camden County Technical Schools

School Data for the Camden County Technical Schools, National Center for Education Statistics

School districts in Camden County, New Jersey
Vocational school districts in New Jersey
Winslow Township, New Jersey